Teri Berukhi is a 2013 Pakistani television drama serial directed by Mohsin Mirza, produced by A&B Entertainment and written by Seema Munaf. It starred Shahood Alvi, Savera Nadeem and Sumbul Iqbal in lead roles, and debuted on 19 April 2013 on Geo Entertainment, in a prime-slot on Fridays at 8:00 pm. The serial also aired on Indian channel Zindagi under the same title.

Plot
Numair is a rich industrialist who is married to Shahtaj, his second wife, but has two children named Anusha and Areeb from his first marriage to Alina. He enjoys this second marriage because Shahtaj is a decent woman than Alina, which envies Alina. Anusha and Areeb also hate Shahtaj but she still treats them like her own children. Gradually the children like Shahtaj and consider her their second mom much to Numair's happiness and Alina's dismay who wants her to divorce him so she can remarry Numair again because she is jealous that Shahtaj is a better wife and mother than her. Alina eventually forces Numair to remarry her which causes huge trouble in all of their lives.

Cast
Sumbul Iqbal
Shahood Alvi
Savera Nadeem
Sukaina Khan
Seemi Pasha
Shehryar Zaidi
Ismat Zaidi
Benita David
Umair Laghari
Mehak Ali
Fahmeed Ahmed

Awards and nominations

References

Pakistani drama television series